William Richard Werstine (born April 16, 1952), known professionally as Billy West, is an American voice actor. His voice roles include Bugs Bunny in the 1996 film Space Jam and several subsequent projects, the title characters of Doug and The Ren & Stimpy Show, as well as the Futurama characters Philip J. Fry, Professor Farnsworth, Dr. Zoidberg, and Zapp Brannigan. In commercials, he voices the Red M&M and formerly voiced Buzz for Honey Nut Cheerios. West also voices other such established characters such as Elmer Fudd, Popeye, Shaggy Rogers, Skeets, Tom, Muttley, and Woody Woodpecker. He was a cast member on The Howard Stern Show, during which time he was noted for his impressions of Larry Fine, Marge Schott, George Takei, and Jackie Martling.

Early life
William Richard Werstine was born in Detroit, Michigan, on April 16, 1952. He is of Irish descent, and was born with ADHD and autism. He grew up in Boston, in the Roslindale neighborhood. After a semester at Berklee College of Music, West found himself in various bands, gigging the Boston scene by night, and selling guitars in a Harvard Square shop during the day.

West has stated that during the Vietnam War, he was subject to the draft lottery under the Nixon administration, receiving a low draft number which would have resulted in his being drafted in 1970. West was ultimately classified "4-F" and excluded from enlistment on medical grounds as he had hypertension and flat feet. West described his later recurring role as Richard Nixon on Futurama as his "revenge" against Nixon. In a 2019 video post, West opined that the "biggest joke" about his experience was the Richard Nixon Presidential Library and Museum subsequently including images and footage of the Futurama Nixon character as part of its "Nixon in Popular Culture" exhibit.

Career

Radio career
In 1980, West was part of an oldies band called The Shutdowns. West worked at WBCN in Boston, performing daily comedic routines on The Big Mattress show, then moved to New York City in 1988, working at K-Rock Radio (92.3 FM WXRK). West became a regular on The Howard Stern Show at that time until leaving in 1995, where he gained notice for his impersonations of Three Stooges middleman Larry Fine, Cincinnati Reds owner Marge Schott and Stern's head writer Jackie Martling. West moved to Los Angeles, where he found success as a voice actor and performer.

Television
He left the radio station in 1988 to work on the short-lived revival of Beany and Cecil, which was his first voice role in television. West's first major roles were on Doug and The Ren & Stimpy Show, which were two of the first three Nicktoons on Nickelodeon (the other being Rugrats). Over his career, West has been the voice talent for close to 120 different characters including some of the most iconic animated figures in television history. He has become one of the few voice actors who can impersonate Mel Blanc in his prime, including characterizations of Bugs Bunny and Daffy Duck, the voice Arthur Q. Bryan used for Elmer Fudd, as well as other characters from Warner Bros. cartoons. In 1998, Entertainment Weekly described West as "the new Mel Blanc" and noted his ability to mimic well-known voices, though he would rather develop original voices. West's favorite characters are Philip J. Fry and Stimpy, both of which he originated. West has been very outspoken over his displeasure about the influx of star actors providing voice-over for films and major shows. West has stated that he did not like the Disney version of Doug and that he "couldn't watch" the show. West was the voice of the show's namesake, Geeker, throughout Project Geekers 13-episode run. West was the voice of Zim in the original pilot for Invader Zim. Richard Steven Horvitz was chosen for the series role because West's voice was too recognizable, according to creator Jhonen Vasquez during DVD commentary. West was the voice of "Red" in numerous M&M commercials, as well as the 3D film I Lost my M in Vegas, currently playing at M&M's World in Las Vegas, Nevada. He also voices a number of minor characters in the series Rick & Steve: The Happiest Gay Couple in All the World. He voiced the character Moobeard in Moobeard the Cow Pirate, a short animation featured on Random! Cartoons and reprises his role as Elmer Fudd in Cartoon Network's series The Looney Tunes Show. In 1999, he also had a cameo in the Emmy Award-winning cartoon Dilbert.

The Ren & Stimpy Show
West provided the voice of Stimpson J. Cat in Nickelodeon's The Ren & Stimpy Show from 1991 until 1996, and he later provided the voice of Ren Höek from 1993 to 1996 when Ren's original voice and series creator John Kricfalusi was fired by Nickelodeon (then a division of the original Viacom) for delivering late and objectionable episodes. He performed other characters on the series, such as Mr. Horse (another role he took over after Kricfalusi's departure) and the announcer for the "Log" ads (a voice West would use years later as the narrator for The Weird Al Show).

According to West, he was originally supposed to do the voice of both Ren and Stimpy (and performed both characters on the tape that was used to sell the show to Nickelodeon), but then Kricfalusi decided to do the voice of Ren himself once the show was sold and he had West on board as part of the selling point. However, West provided Ren's laughter with Kricfalusi as Ren's speaking voice.

Futurama

West's roles in Futurama include Philip J. Fry, Professor Farnsworth, Zapp Brannigan, and Dr. Zoidberg, among others. As he and other Futurama cast and crew point out in DVD commentaries, he voiced so many characters throughout the series that conversations are often held entirely between characters he is voicing. West went into the Futurama auditions and was asked to try out for, as he says, "just about every part". He eventually landed the roles of Farnsworth, Zoidberg, and Brannigan. He later got the main role of Fry, which originally had gone to Charlie Schlatter. While West is known for his original voices, the voice he uses for Fry is often considered to be closer to his natural voice than any other character he has played; in an audio commentary, he states Fry is "just [himself] at age 25". This similarity, West acknowledges, was done purposefully in order to make it harder to replace him in the part along with placing more of himself personally into the role.

The role of Zapp Brannigan was written for the late Phil Hartman, who died before the show started; West was given the role. West has described his interpretation of Zapp Brannigan's voice as an imitation of Hartman, but described the actual vocalizations of the character as being based on "a couple of big dumb announcers I knew." Futurama was renewed by Comedy Central as four direct-to-DVD films broken into 16 television episodes. West reprised his roles for these films and was signed on for two new 26-episode production seasons (four 13-episode air seasons) of Futurama which aired summers of 2010 to 2013.

In 2022, it was announced that Futurama would be returning in 2023 with the original cast, including West.

Advertising
West was the announcer of the program Screen Gems Network which ran from 1999 to 2001. He was the promotional announcer for The Comedy Channel before it merged with HA! to become Comedy Central. Over his career, Billy West has voiced multiple characters in television commercials.
These include (but are not limited to):
 Red, the plain milk chocolate M&M (1996–present) (after Jon Lovitz's departure from the role in 1996).
 Buzz, the bee for Honey Nut Cheerios (1990–2004).
 An alien for Pentium 4.
 Popeye for Minute Maid.
 Babe Ruth, Mickey Goldmill and Bruce Lee for Brisk Iced Tea.
 Marfalump, a mascot for Pepsi from 1999 to 2000; created to tie in with the release of Star Wars: Episode I – The Phantom Menace.
West voiced the Speed Racer character in a late 1990s advertisement for Volkswagen, because the commercial's producers could not locate Peter Fernandez, the original voice of Speed. However, the producers did locate Corinne Orr, the original voice for the characters Trixie and Spritle.

Online
West voiced Graham and Julius F. in Eric Kaplan's web cartoon Zombie College and two characters in Tofu the Vegan Zombie. He appeared on Ken Reid's TV Guidance Counselor Podcast on January 30, 2015. The episode was recorded live at The Smell in Downtown Los Angeles during the third annual Riot LA Comedy Festival.

West began his own podcast show in July 2015. It features him doing numerous characters per episode, recurring segments such as "Song Demolition", "Billy Bastard – Amateur Human Being" and special guest Jim Gomez.

Films
In the 1996 film Space Jam, West voiced Bugs Bunny and Elmer Fudd. He reprised both roles in subsequent Looney Tunes feature-length films and returned as Fudd in the theatrically released Looney Tunes: Back in Action. In 1998, West starred in the direct-to-video film Scooby-Doo on Zombie Island as Shaggy Rogers, becoming the second person to portray the character (the first being Casey Kasem). He was one of the top contenders to replace Kasem after his retirement in 2009 but lost the role to Matthew Lillard. He voiced the role of Muttley in the 2020 Scooby-Doo CGI film Scoob!. In 2000, he provided additional voices in Disney's Dinosaur. In 2004, West voiced the classic character Popeye in the 75th-anniversary film Popeye's Voyage: The Quest for Pappy, and made his live-action film debut in Mark Hamill's Comic Book: The Movie. He also appeared in a cameo in Garfield: The Movie. Other films featuring West's vocal talents include Joe's Apartment, Cats & Dogs, Olive, the Other Reindeer, TMNT, The Proud Family Movie and several Tom and Jerry direct-to-video films.

Music
West is a guitarist and singer-songwriter with a band called Billy West and The Grief Counselors. They have released their first album, Me-Pod. West has toured as a guitarist for Roy Orbison and Brian Wilson.

In 1982, West sang lead, doing an impersonation of Mike Love, on a Beach Boys-inspired tune, "Another Cape Cod Summer This Year," by studio band ROUTE 28, written and produced by Erik Lindgren on his Arf! Arf! Records label.

West has collaborated with Deborah Harry, Lou Reed, and Los Lobos, and he has played live on several occasions with Brian Wilson, including the guitar solo on the Beach Boys tune "Do it Again" on Late Show with David Letterman, in the mid-1990s.

The Futurama episode "Proposition Infinity" features the track "Shut up and Love Me" which was written and played by Billy West and Greg Leon, under the name Wailing Fungus.

Radio
Throughout the 1980s, West provided character voices on Charles Laquidara's Big Mattress radio show on Boston's WBCN. West was one-half of the award-winning WBCN Production team from 1980 to 1986. From 1989 through 1995, West provided The Howard Stern Show with character voices such as Jim Backus, Lucille Ball, Raymond Burr, Johnny Carson, Johnnie Cochran, Connie Chung, Pat Cooper, Jane Curtin, Sammy Davis, Jr., Doris Day, Louis "Red" Deutsch, David Dinkins, Mia Farrow, Larry Fine, Pete Fornatale, Frank Gifford, Kathie Lee Gifford, Rudolph Giuliani, Mark Goddard, Bobcat Goldthwait, the Greaseman, Jonathan Harris (as Dr. Zachary Smith), Leona Helmsley, Evander Holyfield, Shemp Howard, Lance Ito, Elton John, Don Knotts, Jay Leno, Nelson Mandela, Jackie Martling (as the Jackie puppet), Ed McMahon, Al Michaels, Bill Mumy (as Will Robinson), Cardinal O'Connor, Maury Povich, Soon-Yi Previn, Marge Schott, Frank Sinatra, Rae Stern (Howard Stern's mother), George Takei, Joe Walsh and Robin Williams until eventually leaving the show over money. West was an occasional contributor to The Adam Carolla Show, a syndicated morning radio show that replaced Stern's show on CBS in LA. On February 19 and 20, 2007, The Howard Stern Show ran a special two-part retrospective of West's work with the show. It marked his first work with the show since leaving after his last show on November 1, 1995. On June 9, 2009, West appeared on Jackie Martling's Jackie's Joke Hunt on Stern's satellite radio channel Howard 101.

Video games
Characters voiced by West include Bugs Bunny and Elmer Fudd in numerous Looney Tunes video games.

Other video game characters West has voiced include:
 Stimpy in The Ren & Stimpy Show: Veediots! (1993), Nicktoons Racing (2000), and Nicktoons: Attack of the Toybots (2007).
 Dr. Zoidberg in The Simpsons Game (2007).
 Additional Voices in Spyro: Enter the Dragonfly (2002).
 Ricky Sr. and O'Toole in Open Season (2006).
 Sparx in The Legend of Spyro: The Eternal Night (2007).
 Philip J. Fry, Professor Farnsworth, Dr. Zoidberg and Zapp Brannigan in Futurama (2003).
 Nash and Zam in Crash Nitro Kart (2003).
 Voices for the player character in Baldur's Gate II: Shadows of Amn (2000).
 Murfy and other characters in Rayman 3: Hoodlum Havoc (2003).
 Muttley and L'il Gruesome in Wacky Races: Starring Dastardly and Muttley (2001).
 Red in M&M's: The Lost Formulas (2000).
 Hamton J. Pig in Tiny Toon Adventures: Toonenstein. 
 Atomic Bomberman in Atomic Bomberman.
 Emilio Baza in Gabriel Knight 3: Blood of the Sacred, Blood of the Damned.
 Bugs Bunny and Elmer Fudd in Bugs Bunny: Lost in Time (1999).
 The Yak in Nicktoons MLB (2011).
 Fire Kraken, Freeze Blade, Food Fight, Chill Bill and Rocky Roll in Skylanders: Swap Force, Skylanders: Trap Team and Skylanders: SuperChargers.
 The narrator in Minecraft: Story Mode (2015).
 Ren and Stimpy in Nickelodeon All-Star Brawl (2021; voice added as part of the June 6th, 2022 update).

Personal life
West was married to Violet Benny, but they later divorced.

West has spoken openly about the child abuse he experienced from his father. He says he developed his impressionist skills as a way to distract himself from his trauma.

West has been critical of Dick Cheney and the Republican Party, describing Republican senators as "old men with bad breath and dandruff." He has also mocked the tweets of Donald Trump by reading them out in character as Zapp Brannigan, drawing similarities between Trump and the Futurama antagonist.

West purchased a home in the Hollywood Hills West neighborhood of Los Angeles for $480,000 in 1998, and sold it for $1.18 million in March 2016.

Filmography

Film

Animation

Video games

Live-action

Discography
Me-Pod (2004) Label under Universal Records (Philippines)

See also
The Magic Behind the Voices

References

External links

 
 
 
 
 Interview with Billy West on Talk Radio Meltdown

1952 births
Living people
American people of Irish descent
20th-century American male actors
21st-century American male actors
American male voice actors
Male actors from Boston
Male actors from Michigan
Nickelodeon people
Toy collectors
Actors with autism
People with attention deficit hyperactivity disorder